Thomas Beattie Roberton (1879 – 1936) was a Scottish-born Canadian journalist. A columnist and critic for the Winnipeg Free Press from 1918 until his death in 1936, he won the inaugural Governor General's Award for English-language non-fiction at the 1936 Governor General's Awards for his essay collection TBR: Newspaper Pieces.

He wrote on a variety of topics, most commonly literary and jazz reviews but also sometimes expanding into political commentary.

References

1879 births
1936 deaths
20th-century Canadian essayists
20th-century Canadian male writers
Canadian columnists
Canadian literary critics
Canadian male essayists
Canadian music critics
Governor General's Award-winning non-fiction writers
Scottish emigrants to Canada
Writers from Glasgow